The National Academy of Sciences Award is an award presented to South Korean nationals who have made significant contributions to academic development through intensive research on a specific topic. Prize money of KRW 100 million is given in addition to the award. The award is given by the National Academy of Sciences of the Republic of Korea in accordance with Article 14 of the National Academy of Sciences of the Republic of Korea Act and Article 4 of the Academic Academy Prize Award Regulations. The first awards were given in 1955.

Recipients

1955–1985

1986–1998

1999–2007

2008–Current

References

External links
 	National Academy of Sciences of the Republic of Korea (Korean)
 List of Recipients (Korean)

South Korean awards
Awards established in 1955
1955 establishments in South Korea